Noon: 22nd Century is a 1961 science fiction book by Arkady and Boris Strugatsky, expanded in 1962 and further in 1967, translated into English in 1978. It is sometimes considered an episodic novel, collection of linked short stories or a fix-up as some parts had been published previously as independent short stories. It relates several stories of the 22nd century, while providing the background "feeling" for the style of life which gave birth to the Noon Universe.

The title was chosen by the authors as a polemic of the postapocalyptic Daybreak: 2250 AD by Andre Norton. The Noon Universe has been given its name by the fans after this book.

Plot summary 
The book is a collection of short stories describing various aspects of human life on Earth in the 22nd century. The plots of the stories are not closely connected, but they feature a shared set of characters. The most commonly recurring characters are Evgeny Slavin and Sergei Kondratev, who, as a result of a lengthy journey through interstellar space at near the speed of light, are thrown over a century into the future and must re-integrate into the society of their great-grandchildren.

The book includes the following stories:
"Night on Mars" - Two doctors walk on foot on Mars after their vehicle was lost in quicksand. They must avoid an encounter with a local wild beast, while hurrying to assist in the delivery of Evgeny Slavin, the first human born on Mars. (This apparently takes place in the late 20th century.)
"Almost the Same" - Sergei Kondratev as a young man in flight school.
"Old-timer" - The photon engine-driven spaceship Taimyr mysteriously returns to Earth after having disappeared a century earlier. Kondratev and Slavin are the only survivors.
"The Conspirator" - Schoolchildren Pol Gnedykh, Aleksandr "Lin" Kostylin, Mikhail Sidorov, and Gennady Komov plan and dream about their futures.
"Chronicle" - A scientific report giving an analysis of the disappearance and reappearance of the Taimyr.
"Two from the Taimyr" - Kondratev and Slavin recuperate from their wounds after the crash of the Taimyr, and begin to investigate the Earth of the future to which they have returned.
"The Moving Roads" - Kondratev explores Earth on a global system of moving roadways. 
"Cornucopia" - Slavin attempts to adjust to the domestic technology of the future.
"Homecoming" - Kondratev encounters Leonid Gorbovsky, and decides to take a job in oceanography.
"Langour of the Spirit" - Gnedykh and Kostylin reconnect after many years apart.
"The Assaultmen" - Gorbovsky tours the artificial satellites of Vladislava, and journeys to the surface with Sidorov and Ryu Waseda.
"Deep Search" - Kondratev and oceanographer Akiko Okada hunt giant squid on a deep sea expedition.
"The Mystery of the Hind Leg" - Slavin encounters the Collector of Dispersed Data project.
"Candles Before the Control Board" - Okada (now married to Kondratev) tries to visit her dying father, the subject of the Great Encoding
"Natural Science in the Spirit World" - Espers assist the Institute of Space Physics in an effort to explain the Taimyr disappearance and reappearance. 
"Pilgrims and Wayfarers" - Gorbovsky discusses the "Voice of the Void" and other mysteries, and the philosophy of space exploration.
"The Planet with all the Conveniences" - Komov, Waseda, and others explore the planet Leonida and make brief contact with the Leoniders.
"Defeat" - Sidorov tests prototype colonization devices in a remote area on Earth.
"The Meeting" - Gnedykh and Kostylin again meet after a long separation, and Gnedykh regrets his accidental killing of an alien creature who may have been sentient.
"What You Will Be Like" - Kondratev, Slavin, and Gorbovsky explore Tagora. Kondratev and Slavin discuss the progress and stagnation of humanity over their long lifespan, and Gorbovsky tells a fantastic story about his encounter with a visitor from the future.

Notes 
  Comments to the traversed, 1960-1962. note to internet readers about copyright issues

Publication history 
Noon: 22nd Century has been published several times, with different contents.

It was first published in Russian in 1961 in the literary magazine Ural as "chapters from the novel Return," and contained only 10 of the 20 stories:
Old-timer
Chronicle
Two from the Taimyr
The Moving Roads
Cornucopia
Homecoming
The Assaultmen
The Meeting
The Planet with all the Conveniences
What You Will Be Like
The next edition was published in Russian in 1962, and reprinted in 1963. This edition contained 16 of the 20 stories:
Old-timer
The Conspirators
Chronicle
Two from the Taimyr
The Moving Roads
Cornucopia
Homecoming
Langour of the Spirit
The Assaultmen
The Meeting
Deep Search
Candles Before the Control Board
The Mystery of the Hind Leg
Natural Science in the Spirit World
The Planet with all the Conveniences
What You Will Be Like
The 1967 Russian edition was the first to include all 20 stories. All subsequent editions and translations followed the format of the 1967 edition.

External links
 

1961 short story collections
1961 in the Soviet Union
Noon Universe novels
Science fiction short story collections
Macmillan Publishers books
Novels by Arkady and Boris Strugatsky